The Order of Prince Henry is a Portuguese order of knighthood created on 2 June 1960, to commemorate the quincentenary of the death of the Portuguese prince Henry the Navigator, one of the main initiators of the Age of Discovery. Minor reforms of the constitution of the Order occurred in 1962 and 1980. It is a five-tier order, whose titles are awarded for relevant services to Portugal and for services in the expansion of the Portuguese culture, its history and its values (with a particular focus on its maritime history). The number of members in each grade is restricted by its constitution, and titles are attributed by special decree by the Grand Master of the Order, ex officio the President of Portugal.

The following is a complete list of Portuguese citizens and institutions awarded the Grand Collar of the Order, the highest grade, usually reserved for heads of state.

Source for the list: "Entidades Nacionais Agraciadas com Ordens Portuguesas", Ordens Honoríficas Portuguesas (Office of the President of Portugal). Retrieved 18 February 2019.

Portuguese recipients

Foreign recipients

References 

Order of Prince Henry